The Animal Rights Party (TRP) is an inactive animal welfare political party in Austria. It is led by Ralph Chaloupek. It contested the Lower Austrian state election 2008 (although only in Mödling, where it got 854 votes and became the strongest minor party with 1.34% locally). It also contested the 2008 national election, but only in Vienna.

References

External links
 

2007 establishments in Austria
Animal advocacy parties
Political parties established in 2007
Political parties in Austria